Law of the Streets is a French drama film from 1956 directed by Ralph Habib, written by Jean Ferry and starring Raymond Pellegrin and Louis de Funès.

Cast 
 Raymond Pellegrin : 'Jo le Grec", a procurer
 Silvana Pampanini : Wanda, a prostitute
 Jean-Louis Trintignant : Yves Tréguier, called: "Le Breton", young orphan
 Jean Gaven : André Remoulin dit : "Dédé la Glace", the friend of Yves
 Lino Ventura : Mario
 Josette Arno : Zette, Yves' lover
 Fernand Ledoux : Le père Blain, bistro keeper
 Jean-Marc Tennberg : Marcel
 Mary Marquet : Mme Blain
 Roland Lesaffre : Le Grêlé
 Marius Laurey Le Rat
 Robert Dalban : trucker
 Louis de Funès : "Paulo les chiens"

References

External links 
 
 Law of the Streets (1956) at the Films de France

1956 films
French drama films
1950s French-language films
French black-and-white films
Films based on works by Auguste Le Breton
Films directed by Ralph Habib
1950s French films
1956 drama films

ru:Малютки у простофили (фильм)